Arzu Rana Deuba (born 26 January 1962) is a member of the Nepali Congress Party of Nepal since 1996 and elected Central Committee member of the party since December 2021. She is currently serving as a member of the Parliament. In the 2022 Nepalese general election she was elected as a proportional representative from the Khas people category. She is the wife of former PM Sher Bahadur Deuba.

Deuba is the member of Nepali Congress Party convention and Central Leadership Voting Committee since 2000. She was a member of Constituent Assembly and Parliament of Nepal for ten years (2008-2017). She pursued issues such as women's rights, especially reproductive rights, equal citizenship rights, equal property rights, violence against women, and women's equitable and equal political representation at all levels while writing the constitution of Nepal.

She was a member of the Constitution Drafting Committee and served as Chair of the Women Parliamentarians Coordination Committee. Deuba is a gender activist and social worker and has established a number of women and children related NGOs in Nepal, including RUWDUC, Saathi, SMNF and established SAMANTA, a research-based institute for social and gender equality. She served as an elected regional councilor for South and East Asia for IUCN and currently serves as the board of Ipas and the Mahatma Gandhi Institute of Education for Peace and Sustainable Development based in New Delhi.

Deuba served as Chair of the Gender and Biodiversity Task Force (GBTF) of the IUCN Council as well as a member of the steering committee of the Commission on Environmental, Economic and Social Policy (CEESP) and co-chair of the Theme on Environment, Conflict, and Security (TECS). She also served on the Bureau of IUCN Council. She represented IUCN as the keynote speaker at the IUCN-PATA Asia Pacific Conference in 2009 and also as Keynote Speaker on the Himalayas at a Mountain Conference organized in Munich, Germany by ICIMOD and its partners in 2010. Deuba was re-elected as the IUCN Regional Councillor from South and East Asia in the IUCN World Conservation Congress (WCC). She was invited as Speaker in diverse international forums including at the Human Rights Council in Geneva, March 2017.

Education
Deuba graduated from St. Bedes College, Himachal Pradesh University. She obtained her master's degree from Punjab University. She also obtained her Ph.D. in organizational Psychology in 1990 from Punjab University India.

Political career
Deuba has been a member of the Nepali Congress Party of Nepal since 1996. Since 2000, she has been a member of the Nepali Congress Party convention and Central Leadership Voting Committee. She was a member of the Constituent Assembly and Parliament of Nepal for ten years (2008-2017). She pursued issues such as women's rights, especially reproductive rights, equal citizenship rights, equal property rights, violence against women, women's equitable and equal political representation at all levels while writing the constitution of Nepal.

Social works
Deuba has established a number of women and children issues related non-government organizations (NGOs) in Nepal, which include- Saathi (1992) which works on elimination of violence against women; The Rural Women's Development and Unity Centre (1995) which works in areas with the lowest human development indicators; The Safe Motherhood Network Federation (1996) which works in the area of reproductive health and rights; and Samanata – Institute for Social & Gender Equality (1997) which is a research-based organization.

Deuba was elected as regional councilor of the World Conservation Union (IUCN) during its fourth world congress held in Barcelona, Spain in October 2008. Deuba is the first candidate to be elected from Nepal in IUCN's highest decision-making body. She served for two terms as an elected regional councilor for South & East Asia for IUCN (2008 – 2016). She currently serves on the board of IPAS, USA (2014 ongoing) and the Mahatma Gandhi Institute for Education for Peace and Sustainable Development, which is a UNESCO Type I institution based in New Delhi, India (2014 ongoing).  She is also associated with the White Ribbon Alliance for safe motherhood. Deuba was a panelist on discussion on preventable maternal mortality and morbidity and human rights at the 34th session of the Human Rights Council (Geneva 2017).

Family life
She is married to former Prime Minister and President of Nepali Congress Party, Sher Bahadur Deuba.

References

1962 births
Living people
Nepali Congress politicians from Sudurpashchim Province
21st-century Nepalese women politicians
21st-century Nepalese politicians
Nepalese Hindus
Himachal Pradesh University alumni
People from Lalitpur District, Nepal
Spouses of prime ministers of Nepal
Members of the 1st Nepalese Constituent Assembly
Members of the 2nd Nepalese Constituent Assembly
Nepal MPs 2022–present